Princess Izabella Elżbieta Czartoryska (19 December 1832 – 18 March 1899) was a Polish noblewoman.

On 21 February 1857, Izabella was married to Count Jan Kanty Działyński (1829–1880), son of Tytus Działyński in Paris, France. Their marriage produced no children.

1832 births
1899 deaths
Izabella Elzbieta Czartoryska
19th-century Polish nobility